Rowena Wallace (born 23 August 1947) is an English-born Australian stage and screen actress, most especially in the genre of television soap opera. She is best known for her Gold Logie-winning role as conniving Patricia "Pat the Rat" Hamilton/Morrell/Palmer in Sons and Daughters, being the first soap star to win the Gold Logie. After leaving the series and being replaced in the role by Belinda Giblin, Wallace returned in the final season as Patricia's sister Pamela Hudson.

She started her career on the small screen in the late 60's in serial You Can't See 'Round Corners as well as appearing in that serial's film version and then had regular roles in TV series including Crawford Productions Division 4,  Number 96 and Cop Shop and in 1980-1981 became well known for her stint as Anne Griffin in cult series Prisoner.

After Sons and Daughters, she subsequently appeared primarily in guest roles and cameos in numerous TV serials, before again returning to more permanent fixtures  in regular roles from 2000 to 2003 in Home and Away as June Reynolds, in Neighbours in 2007 as Mary Casey and in Deadly Women as gangland figure Judy Moran in 2012.

She has appeared as herself as a panellist on talk show Beauty and the Beast and featured regularly on Bert Newton's popular morning breakfast show Good Morning Australia.

Early life

Rowena Wallace was born in Coventry, West Midlands, England, as an only child.  She moved to Australia with her parents when she was five, settling in the state of Queensland. Her father was a pilot for Ansett Airlines. Initially she grew up in Cairns and later moved to Brisbane at the age of 12 years. There, she attended Kedron State High School. After finishing school she became interested in acting and was taken by her mother to dancing lessons at, and was also persuaded to join, the Twelfth Night Theatre under the artistic direction of Joan Whalley.

At age fifteen, having left school and attended a business college at the insistence of her parents, Wallace decided to become an actress. She joined an advertising agency while still performing in the theatre at night. Her first television role was in Brisbane as an entertainer on the variety show Theatre Royal hosted by George Wallace Jnr (no relation). She also presented the afternoon news and weather and a children's show. At the age of nineteen, Wallace was diagnosed with scoliosis. She has required painkillers almost continuously since then.

Career

While Wallace was working in television in Brisbane, Barry Creyton persuaded the producers of a new series to fly her down to Sydney to audition for the lead role in their show; as a result Wallace won the role of Margie Harris in You Can't See 'Round Corners in 1967 and moved to Sydney. She would also feature in the 1969 film version.

After completing Corners, she went on to star as the juvenile lead in a hit comedy stage production with John McCallum and Googie Withers. The show, Relatively Speaking, played to packed audiences in Melbourne.

On 12 February 1970, the film Squeeze a Flower had its world premiere in Sydney. Wallace starred in the movie as the female lead, opposite international Italian film star Walter Chiari.  By 1972, she had found work intermittently.  In 1973 she married George Assang, some 20 years her senior, a Thursday Island-born jazz singer and actor known professionally as Vic Sabrino. The marriage lasted just over a year, and Wallace has had no long-term relationships since then.

Number 96 and Prisoner

In the late 1970s she appeared frequently on Australian television, with an ongoing role in the soap opera Number 96 in 1975–1976, followed by a regular role in the police drama Cop Shop, playing policeman's wife Pamela Taylor. After leaving that series she played a mentally unbalanced remand prisoner named Anne Griffin in Prisoner for several weeks in late 1980.

Awards

Rowena Wallace's most famous role was in the soap opera Sons and Daughters, in which she played Patricia Dunne/Hamilton/Morrell/Palmer; starting in 1981. Nicknamed Pat the Rat, the character became an immensely popular bitch figure in the series; its most famous character.
  

In 1984 Wallace won a Gold Logie for the portrayal during an era when Gold Logies were usually won by major television personalities and hosts but not actors. She was the first woman soap actress to win the award since it was opened up to Most Popular Australian Personality.. She was not the first female to win the Gold Logie, that honour going to Australian actress Lorrae Desmond.

Wallace also received 4 Silver Logies

Sons and Daughters

Wallace left Sons and Daughters after three years, with her final scenes going to air early in 1985 just after her Gold Logie win. Wallace claimed in a reunion documentary that she left due to exhaustion from playing such an intense character. She also claimed she regretted walking away from the role as she did not get the later acting offers she had anticipated. The popularity of her character led to it being recast, with Belinda Giblin assuming the role of a returning Patricia after extensive cosmetic surgery had altered her facial features. Late in the show's run, with ratings in decline, Wallace was returned to the series in an attempt to boost the show's popularity. With Giblin remaining in the show, Wallace now played a new character, that of Patricia's long-lost identical twin sister Pamela. Her return lasted ten weeks but did little to halt the show's dwindling ratings, and the show was cancelled shortly afterwards.

Home and Away and Neighbours

Between years 2000 and 2003 Wallace appeared in the weeknight soap opera Home and Away as June Reynolds.

In 2007 Wallace joined the cast of Neighbours for several months. She played Mary Casey, an unstable woman who ended up in prison for the false imprisonment of Pepper Steiger. Mary's cellmate turned out to be Sky Mangel.

Other roles

In 2012 Wallace starred as Melbourne gangland matriarch Judy Moran in the Foxtel series Deadly Women.

In September 2016 Wallace had a cameo in Wonthaggi Theatrical Group's production of Little Shop of Horrors as the narrator.

Personal life

After being with George assang divorce in 1974 Between July 1999 and November 2003, Wallace was collecting a disability support pension, despite being actively employed by television series such as Water Rats, Beauty and the Beast, and Good Morning Australia. In October 2005, she was charged with social security fraud, and given a suspended sentence of six months imprisonment.

In August 2010, Wallace was the subject of a Today Tonight special feature on the Seven Network, where she was reportedly nearly broke and on the verge of becoming homeless. The following week, a number of offers to take her in were made by Australians around the country.

In March 2011, she was the subject of more media coverage, this time because the unit she occupied at subsidised rent in Wonthaggi, Victoria was due for demolition in August 2011 and she feared she would have nowhere to live.  The rents in Wonthaggi had doubled or even tripled due to the Wonthaggi Desalination Plant being constructed nearby, but her pension would not even cover her rent.

Filmography

Film

Television

STAGE/THEATRE
 Hamlet (1963)
 Calamity Jane (1964)
 King Lear (1965)
 Little Red Riding Hood (1965)
 God Save The Queen (1966)
 Relatively Speaking (1970)
 By Candlelight (1973)
 Old Times (1978)
 Rattle Of A Simple Man (1981)
 Stepping Out (1985)
 A Coupla White Chicks (1986-1987)
 Bedroom Farce (1987)
 How The Other Half Loves? (1989)
 42nd Street (1989)
 Blithe Spirit (1990)
 Double Act (1991)
 Same Time, Next Year (1992)
 Lend Me A Tenor (1993)
 Deceptions (1993)
 Night Of 1001 Stars (1994)
 Rebecca (1997)
 Follies (2000)
 The Sound Of Music (2001)
 The Vagina Monologues (2001)
 Bench (2002)
 Mavis Bramston Reloaded (2006)
 Theatresports (2008)
 Little Shop Of Horrors (2016)
 The Secret Garden (2020)

References

External links

 
 Femail article

1947 births
Living people
Actresses from Brisbane
Actresses from Coventry
English emigrants to Australia
Australian film actresses
Australian stage actresses
Gold Logie winners
Australian people with disabilities
Australian soap opera actresses
Naturalised citizens of Australia